The Centre de musique romantique française ("centre for French Romantic music") is a French-administered cultural institution, research centre and concert hall, in Venice, in north-eastern Italy. The centre opened in October 2009. It is funded by the Fondation Bru, which also bought, restored and renamed the Casino Zane. The centre uses the name Palazzetto Bru Zane − Centre de musique romantique française.

The Palazzetto 

This Casino was to house his collection of books and paintings, and to serve as a venue for art, music, and amusement. The architect Antonio Gaspari was responsible for the interior decoration. Palazzo Zane later passed to the Venier family, and in about 1784 was sold to the Collalto.

In 2006 the Fondation Bru bought the Casino from Dominic Habsburg-Lothringen for eight million euros, and then spent more than four million more on restoring it. The building now holds offices, studios, a library, and the original concert hall, which now holds an Erard piano from 1902. The frescoes in the salon and on the grand staircase, now attributed to Sebastiano Ricci, were also restored.

Activities 

The centre has a staff of fifteen, and an annual budget of three million euros. It organises concerts, opera performances, and festivals both in Venice and elsewhere. It also organises musicological conferences and publishes books, sheet music, and musical recordings, either independently or in co-operation with more than 40 labels. It operates an internet radio station, Bru Zane Classical Radio, which broadcasts only French Romantic music.

References

External links

 
 Bru Zane Mediabase
 Bru Zane Classical Radio
 Season Brochure 2016/17

Culture in Venice
Concert halls in Italy
Cultural promotion organizations
France–Italy relations
2009 establishments in Italy
Organizations established in 2009